Menkia is a genus of gastropods belonging to the family Aciculidae.

The species of this genus are found in Pyrenees.

Species:

Menkia celleneuva 
Menkia dewinteri 
Menkia horsti 
Menkia rolani

References

Aciculidae